Nasourdin Abdoulazimovitch Imavov (born March 1, 1995) is a French mixed martial artist who competes in the Middleweight division of the Ultimate Fighting Championship. As of February 27, 2023, he is #11 in the UFC middleweight rankings.

Background
At the age of 9, Imavov started boxing when he arrived in France from Dagestan, Russia with his family in Salon-de-Provence. After that, he discovered MMA and at 19, he moved to Paris with his older brother Daguir, where they joined Fernand Lopez’s MMA Factory.

Mixed martial arts career

Early career
Starting his professional career in 2016, Imavov compiled a 8–2 record. He was riding a 5 bout win streak before signing with the UFC, during which time he picked up the Thunderstrike Fight League Welterweight Championship and a first-round beat down of former UFC welterweight Jonathan Meunier at ARES FC 1 on December 14, 2019.

Ultimate Fighting Championship
Imavov made his UFC debut against Jordan Williams on October 4, 2020 at UFC on ESPN: Holm vs. Aldana. He won the bout via unanimous decision.

Imavov faced Phil Hawes at UFC Fight Night: Blaydes vs. Lewis on February 20, 2021. Despite a late storm by Imavov, he lost the bout via majority decision.

Imavov faced Ian Heinisch on July 24, 2021 at UFC on ESPN: Sandhagen vs. Dillashaw. He won the fight via technical knockout in round two.

Imavov faced Edmen Shahbazyan on November 6, 2021 at UFC 268. He won the fight via TKO due to elbows from crucifix position in round two.

Imavov was scheduled to face Kelvin Gastelum on April 9, 2022, at UFC 273. However, Imavov was forced to withdraw due to visa issues and the bout was cancelled.

Imavov faced Joaquin Buckley on September 3, 2022 at UFC Fight Night 209. He won the fight via unanimous decision.

Imavov was scheduled to face Kelvin Gastelum on January 14, 2023 at UFC Fight Night 217. However, Gastelum was forced to withdraw due to a mouth injury, and was replaced by Sean Strickland, with the bout taking place at light heavyweight. He lost the fight via unanimous decision.

Championships and accomplishments

Mixed martial arts 

 Thunderstrike Fight League
 TFL Welterweight Championship (One time)

Mixed martial arts record

|Loss
|align=center|12–4
|Sean Strickland
|Decision (unanimous)
|UFC Fight Night: Strickland vs. Imavov
|
|align=center|5
|align=center|5:00
|Las Vegas, Nevada, United States
|
|-
|Win
|align=center|12–3
|Joaquin Buckley
|Decision (unanimous)
|UFC Fight Night: Gane vs. Tuivasa
|
|align=center|3
|align=center|5:00
|Paris, France
|
|-
|Win
|align=center|11–3
|Edmen Shahbazyan
|TKO (elbows)
|UFC 268
|
|align=center|2
|align=center|4:42
|New York City, New York, United States
|
|-
|Win
|align=center|10–3
|Ian Heinisch
|TKO (knee and punches)
|UFC on ESPN: Sandhagen vs. Dillashaw
|
|align=center|2
|align=center|3:09
|Las Vegas, Nevada, United States
|
|-
| Loss
| align=center|9–3
|Phil Hawes
| Decision (majority)
| UFC Fight Night: Blaydes vs. Lewis
| 
| align=center| 3
| align=center| 5:00
| Las Vegas, Nevada, United States
|
|-
| Win
| align=center| 9–2
| Jordan Williams
|Decision (unanimous)
|UFC on ESPN: Holm vs. Aldana
|
|align=center|3
|align=center|5:00
|Abu Dhabi, United Arab Emirates
|
|-
| Win
| align=center| 8–2
| Jonathan Meunier
|TKO (punches)
|ARES FC 1
| 
|align=center|1
|align=center|4:27
|Dakar, Senegal
|
|-
| Win
| align=center| 7–2
| Mateusz Głuch
|Submission (kimura)
|Thunderstrike Fight League 18
|
|align=center|1
|align=center|N/A
|Kozienice, Poland
| 
|-
| Win
| align=center| 6–2
| Francesco Demontis
|Submission (rear-naked choke)
|Devil's Cage
|
|align=center|1
|align=center|2:26
|Quartu Sant'Elena, Italy
| 
|-
| Win
| align=center| 5–2
| Gregor Weibel
|Decision (unanimous)
| City Cage MMA
| 
|align=center|3
|align=center|5:00
| Luzern, Switzerland
|
|-
| Win
| align=center|4–2
|Gary Formosa
|TKO (punches)
|Centurion FC 2
|
|align=center|1
|align=center|2:02
|Paola, Malta
|
|-
| Loss
| align=center|3–2
|Michał Michalski
|Decision (unanimous)
|Fight Exclusive Night 19
|
|align=center|3
|align=center|5:00
|Wrocław, Poland
|
|-
| Win
| align=center| 3–1
| Paul Lawrence
|TKO (punches)
|Centurion FC 1
|
|align=center|1
|align=center|2:43
|Paola, Malta
|
|-
| Win
| align=center|2–1
| Yanis Cheufre
|Submission (brabo choke)
| Fight Night One 4
|
| align=center|1
| align=center|2:32
|Saint Étienne, France
|
|-
| Win
| align=center| 1–1
| Said Magomed Tachaev
| Submission (rear-naked choke)
|Gladiator Fighting Arena 3
|
| align=center|1
| align=center|3:20
|Nîmes, France
|
|-
| Loss
| align=center|0–1
| Ayadi Majdeddine
| Submission (guillotine choke)
|100% Fight 27
|
|align=center|1
|align=center|4:49
|Paris, France
|

See also 
 List of current UFC fighters
 List of male mixed martial artists

References

External links
  
 

1996 births
Living people
French male mixed martial artists
Russian male mixed martial artists
Middleweight mixed martial artists
Mixed martial artists utilizing boxing
Ultimate Fighting Championship male fighters
Russian emigrants to France
French people of Dagestani descent
Russian people of Dagestani descent
Sportspeople from Dagestan